Joseph Cole Hefner, known as Cole Hefner (born November 13, 1980), is a Republican member of the Texas House of Representatives from Mount Pleasant, Texas. He was first elected in 2016 to represent the 5th District and assumed office in January 2017. He succeeded Bryan Hughes, who was instead elected to the Texas Senate.

Hefner handily won a second legislative term in the general election held on November 6, 2018. With 44,264 votes (79.3 percent), he defeated Democrat Bill Liebbe, who polled 11,540 votes (20.7 percent).

References

External links
 Cole Hefner for State Representative
 State legislative page
 Cole Hefner at the Texas Tribune

1980 births
Living people
Republican Party members of the Texas House of Representatives
21st-century American politicians
Businesspeople from Texas
People from Mount Pleasant, Texas